The 2021 America East Conference baseball tournament was held from May 27 to May 30, 2021. The top four teams out of the league's eight members met in the double-elimination tournament held at Joe Nathan Field in Stony Brook, New York. The tournament champion, New Jersey Institute of Technology, received the conference's automatic bid into the 2021 NCAA Division I baseball tournament.

Bracket

Conference championship
There was no championship game held in 2021. Per conference policy, NJIT received the league's automatic bid to the NCAA tournament as the lone unbeaten team in the championship after the remainder of the 2021 America East Conference Championship was unable to be completed due to inclement weather.

References

Tournament
America East Conference Baseball Tournament
America East Conference Baseball
America East Conference baseball tournament
College baseball tournaments in New York (state)